Diabat is a village in western Morocco near the coast of the Atlantic Ocean about five kilometres south of the city of Essaouira. (Ellingham, 2007)  The Bordj El Berod is a ruined watchtower located somewhat south of the mouth of Oued Ksob (Hogan, 2007) near about one kilometre west of Diabat.

See also
 Diabatic (Energy surfaces in Quantum Mechanics)
 Oued Ksob
Bordj El Berod

References
 Mark Ellingham (2007) The Rough Guide to Morocco, London, England 
  C. Michael Hogan, Mogador: Promontory fort, The Megalithic Portal, edited by Andy Burnham, 2007

Literature
 TAST, Brigitte; TAST, Hans-Juergen. Still the wind cries Jimi. Hendrix in Marokko, Schellerten, 2012, 

Populated places in Essaouira Province